Jenny Klitch (born April 19, 1965) is a former professional tennis player from the United States.

Biography
Klitch, who grew up in Columbus, Ohio, played on the professional tour in the 1980s. She won one WTA Tour title, the Virginia Slims of Nashville in 1984. Other highlights include making the third round of the 1984 French Open and a win over Helena Suková at the 1984 U.S. Clay Court Championships.

Now working as a lawyer, Klitch is based in Palm Beach County, Florida.

Like many former Tennis players, Klitch pivoted to competitive Pickleball in 2020, as the sport exploded in popularity in the United States.  In August 2021, Klitch was named the Commissioner of the newly-created Major League Pickleball league.  She served in that capacity from MLP's creation until September 2022.  In September 2022, Klitch was named Senior Vice President, Pro Player Relations and Competition for the Association of Pickleball Professionals (APP) tour.

WTA Tour finals

Singles (1-1)

References

External links
 
 

1965 births
Living people
American female tennis players
Tennis people from Ohio
Sportspeople from Columbus, Ohio
21st-century American women